The 1916 New Zealand rugby league season was the ninth season of rugby league that had been played in New Zealand.

International competitions

New Zealand played no international matches in 1916.

National competitions

Northern Union Cup
Auckland again held the Northern Union Cup at the end of the season.

Club competitions

Auckland

City won the Auckland Rugby League's competition and the Roope Rooster.

Ponsonby United captain Scotty McClymount won the title of favourite player in a public charity vote  held to raise funds for the War effort. City's Albert Asher was second and Grafton's Karl Ifwersen finished third.

Other Competitions
The Wellington Rugby League's competition was suspended from 1916 until 1918. The Canterbury Rugby League's competition was suspended for the 1916 season.

References

New Zealand rugby league seasons